Ghapama is an Armenian stuffed pumpkin dish, often prepared during the Christmas season. It is also common to pour on honey and mix in ground cinnamon or sugar. The pumpkin is then baked until it becomes soft, then brought to the table where it is cut up and served.

There is an Armenian song about the meal known as Հէյ Ջան Ղափամա (Hey Jan Ghapama), popularized by Harout Pamboukjian.

See also
 List of desserts
 List of squash and pumpkin dishes
 List of stuffed dishes

References

External links

Armeniapedia - Ghapama

Armenian cuisine
Stuffed dishes
Squash and pumpkin dishes